The 2007 New Zealand Music awards took place on 18 October at the Aotea Centre in Auckland, which also included the first inductee into the New Zealand Music Hall of Fame. A number of awards were presented at parallel ceremonies (the NZ Radio Awards, Technical Awards, Gold Guitar Awards, Pacific Music Awards, Auckland Folk Festival, and the Wellington International Jazz Festival).

Multiple winners on the night included The Mint Chicks with five awards (including guitarist Ruban Nielson's Best Cover), Hollie Smith with three awards and Evermore with two.

Awards and nominees
Winners are listed first and highlighted in boldface.
Key
 – Non-technical award
 – Technical award

New Zealand Music Hall of Fame
This year was the first to include an award for the New Zealand Music Hall of Fame, a split award shared between RIANZ and APRA. The first inductee was Johnny Devlin.

References

External links
 NZ Musician coverage of the winners

New Zealand Music Awards
Music Awards
Aotearoa Music Awards
October 2007 events in New Zealand